The Charlie O'Donnell Sports Grounds is an association football (soccer) stadium located in Buncrana, County Donegal, Ireland. It is the home ground of Cockhill Celtic F.C.

The grounds were opened as St. Mary's Park in 2003 by Mary Coughlan TD. The club grounds were renamed after longtime chairman Charlie O'Donnell in 2007. The club also has two astroturf pitches.

In 2017 the grounds suffered flood damage; the club received €101,000 from a UEFA Natural Disaster Grant.

References

Association football venues in the Republic of Ireland
Buildings and structures in County Donegal
Sports venues in County Donegal
Sports venues completed in 2003
2003 establishments in Ireland
Buncrana
21st-century architecture in the Republic of Ireland